Żukowice  is a village in Głogów County, Lower Silesian Voivodeship, in south-western Poland. It is the seat of the administrative district (gmina) called Gmina Żukowice.

The village has a population of 55.

References

Villages in Głogów County